Anisophyllea impressinervia is a tree of Borneo in the family Anisophylleaceae. The specific epithet  is from the Latin meaning "sunken veins", referring to the leaf veins.

Description
The bark is cracking to flaky.

Distribution and habitat
Anisophyllea impressinervia is endemic to Borneo, where it is possibly confined to Sabah. Its habitat is lowland secondary forests at around  altitude.

References

impressinervia
Trees of Borneo
Endemic flora of Borneo
Flora of Sabah
Plants described in 1993
Taxonomy articles created by Polbot
Flora of the Borneo lowland rain forests